Prospect Park is an unincorporated community and census-designated place in Shippen Township, Cameron County, Pennsylvania, United States. It is located along Pennsylvania Route 155 just east of the borough of Emporium. As of the 2010 census, the population in Prospect Park was 327 residents.

Demographics

References

External links

Census-designated places in Pennsylvania
Census-designated places in Cameron County, Pennsylvania